A Christmas Carol is a 2020 British Christmas drama dance film directed by Jacqui Morris and David Morris and based on Charles Dickens' 1843 novella A Christmas Carol.  It features the voices of Simon Russell Beale, Siân Phillips, Carey Mulligan, Daniel Kaluuya, Andy Serkis, Martin Freeman and Leslie Caron. It received mixed reviews from critics.

Plot 
The story starts with a grandmother narrating the story to her children as the children prepare a toy theatre for their annual performance of A Christmas Carol. The movie enters the imagination of Emily - the young girl in the family, and the cardboard stage transforms to reveal a magical world.

A close adaptation of the book's prose, this version of A Christmas Carol opens on a bleak, cold Christmas Eve in London, seven years after the death of Ebenezer Scrooge's business partner, Jacob Marley. Scrooge, an elderly miser, despises Christmas and refuses a dinner invitation from his nephew Fred, the son of Scrooge's long-dead sister Fan. He turns away two men who seek a donation from him to provide food and heating for the poor and only grudgingly allows his overworked, underpaid clerk, Bob Cratchit, Christmas Day off with pay to conform to the social custom.

That night Scrooge is visited at home by Marley's ghost, who wanders the Earth entwined by heavy chains and money boxes forged during a lifetime of greed and selfishness. Marley tells Scrooge that he has one chance to avoid the same fate: he will be visited by three spirits and must listen or be cursed to carry much heavier chains of his own.

The first spirit, the Ghost of Christmas Past, takes Scrooge to Christmas scenes of his boyhood. The scenes reveal Scrooge's lonely childhood at boarding school, his relationship with his beloved sister Fan, and a Christmas party hosted by his first employer, Mr Fezziwig, who treated him like a son. Scrooge's neglected fiancée Belle is shown ending their relationship, as she realizes that he will never love her as much as he loves money. Finally, they visit a now-married Belle with her large, happy family on the Christmas Eve that Marley died. When Belle speaks of Scrooge with pity, demands that the ghost remove him from the house.

The second spirit, the Ghost of Christmas Present, takes Scrooge to a joyous market with people buying the makings of Christmas dinner and to celebrations of Christmas in a miner's cottage and in a lighthouse. Scrooge and the ghost also visit Fred's Christmas party. A major part of this stave is taken up with Bob Cratchit's family feast and introduces his youngest son Tiny Tim, who is seriously ill. The spirit informs Scrooge that Tiny Tim will die unless the course of events changes. Before disappearing, the spirit shows Scrooge two hideous, emaciated children named Ignorance and Want. He tells Scrooge to beware the former above all and mocks Scrooge's concern for their welfare. A short, heavily-edited dance number demonstrates what the two children might become; Ignorance, a street fighter, and Want, a prostitute.

The third spirit, the Ghost of Christmas Yet to Come, shows Scrooge a Christmas Day in the future. The silent ghost reveals scenes involving the death of a disliked man whose funeral is attended by local businessmen only on condition that lunch is provided. His charwoman, laundress and the local undertaker steal his possessions to sell to a fence. When he asks the spirit to show a single person who feels emotion over his death, he is only given the pleasure of a poor couple who rejoice that his death gives them more time to put their finances in order. When Scrooge asks to see tenderness connected with any death, the ghost shows him Bob Cratchit and his family mourning the death of Tiny Tim. The ghost then allows Scrooge to see a neglected grave, with a tombstone bearing Scrooge's name. Sobbing, Scrooge pledges to change his ways.

Scrooge awakens on Christmas morning a changed man. He makes a large donation to the charity he rejected the previous day, anonymously sends a large turkey to the Cratchit home for Christmas dinner and spends the afternoon with Fred's family. The following day he gives Cratchit an increase in pay, and begins to become a father figure to Tiny Tim. From then on, Scrooge treats everyone with kindness, generosity and compassion, embodying the spirit of Christmas.

Emily is delighted by the performance and the grandmother finishes her narration.

Cast
Siân Phillips as Grandmother/Narrator
 Thea Achillea as Emily
 Michael Nunn as Ebenezer Scrooge
 Simon Russell Beale as the voice of Ebenezer Scrooge
 Grace Jabbari as Belle
 Carey Mulligan as the voice of Belle
 Brekke Fagerlund Karl as Bob Cratchit/The Ghost of Christmas Yet to Come
 Martin Freeman as the voice of Bob Cratchit
 Mikey Boateng as The Ghost of Christmas Present
 Daniel Kaluuya as the voice of The Ghost of Christmas Present
 Russell Maliphant as Marley's Ghost
 Andy Serkis as the voice of Marley's Ghost
 Dana Maliphant as The Ghost of Christmas Past
 Leslie Caron as the voice of The Ghost of Christmas Past
 Danil Golovam as Tiny Tim
 Archie Durrant as the voice of Tiny Tim
 Simone Donati as Fred
 Oliver John Lock as Fred's voice
 Faith Prendergast as Martha
 Sydney Craven as the voice of Martha
 Elleanor Perry as Sarah
 Sarah Schoenbeck as Sarah's voice
 Robert Cotton as Father
 Georgina Sutcliffe as Mother

Release
The film was released theatrically in the United Kingdom on 20 November 2020.  It was also released theatrically in the United States on 4 December 2020.

Reception
The film has  rating on Rotten Tomatoes from  reviews.  Tracey Petherick of Common Sense Media awarded the film four stars out of five.

Stephen Dalton of The Hollywood Reporter gave the film a negative review, calling it "Technically impressive but dramatically flat."

Martin Unsworth of Starburst gave the film a positive review and wrote, "It’s a tale that has been retold numerous times to varying effect. This adaptation utilises Charles Dickens’ original text as a spoken story over a dazzling ballet-esque depiction of the ultimate Yuletide story."

See also
 List of Christmas films
 Adaptations of A Christmas Carol

References

External links
 
 

2020 films
Films based on A Christmas Carol
British computer-animated films
2020 computer-animated films
British Christmas drama films
2020s English-language films
2020s British films